The Eindhovense Mixed Hockey Club (acronym: EMHC) was a Dutch field hockey club, which was located in Eindhoven, North Brabant. The club was founded on October 14, 1921, and had about 1,000 members. This made it the second biggest club of the city, after neighbouring Oranje Zwart.

In 2016, the club merged with Oranje Zwart. The name of the new club is HC Oranje-Rood.

Honours

Women
Dutch national title: 3
1957, 1966, 1968

Notable players 
 Det de Beus
 Fieke Boekhorst

References

External links
  Official website of EMHC

Dutch field hockey clubs
Field hockey clubs established in 1921
1921 establishments in the Netherlands
Field hockey clubs disestablished in 2016
Sports clubs in Eindhoven
History of Eindhoven
2016 disestablishments in the Netherlands